Heron station is a stop on Ottawa's transitway served by OC Transpo buses. It is located in the south-eastern transitway section at Heron Park on Heron Road.

Nearby government buildings including Canada Post and Confederation station for the O-Train, are the main trip generators as well as a residential area just to its east.

Service

The following routes serve Heron:

Notes 
 Route  only serves this stop when Line  is not in service during its normal operating hours. This route serves all 4 stops at this station (both on Data Centre Road and on the southeast Transitway).

References

External links

OC Transpo station page
OC Transpo Area Map

Transitway (Ottawa) stations